Andy Muirhead (born 8 July 1993) is an Australian-born rugby union player who plays for the  in the Super Rugby competition.  His position of choice is wing.

Muirhead was born and raised in Brisbane, where he attended Brisbane State High School, playing for their first XV rugby team. Following school he signed with the South Brisbane Magpies in the Brisbane Premier Rugby competition. He played for the club until 2014. Andy then took up an opportunity to move to New Zealand and play in the ITM cup with Counties Manukau RFU and under head coach, and All Blacks great, Tana Umaga. Muirhead made the move back to Australia in 2015, helping Souths win the Premier Rugby title that year. Following a stellar season he was chosen to play with Brisbane City in the NRC rugby competition. Towards the end of 2016 Muirhead moved to Canberra for an opportunity to train with the ACT Brumbies. In 2017 Andy was rewarded with an opportunity to join their tour of South Africa and Argentina. Debuting off the bench, Andy scored two tries and had a very strong finish to the season. For his efforts he was rewarded a full-time contract with the Brumbies where he remains.

Since his debut Andy has represented the ACT Brumbies more than 60 times and was also selected in the Wallabies squad in 2021.

Muirhead is indigenous Australian, through his mother

References 

1993 births
Living people
Australian rugby union players
Rugby union wings
Counties Manukau rugby union players
Brisbane City (rugby union) players
ACT Brumbies players
Canberra Vikings players
Rugby union players from Brisbane